Warden Flood (1694 – 16 April 1764) was an Irish judge who held office as Lord Chief Justice of Ireland, but is mainly remembered now as the natural father of the statesman Henry Flood.

He was born at Burnchurch in County Kilkenny, son of Francis Flood and Anne Warden. He was educated at Kilkenny College and the University of Dublin, taking his degree of Bachelor of Arts in 1714. He entered Middle Temple in 1716 and was called to the Irish Bar in 1720.

He was appointed Solicitor-General for Ireland in 1741, Attorney-General for Ireland in 1751, and in 1760 was appointed Chief Justice of the King's Bench for Ireland. He acted as a judge of assize and was briefly Speaker of the Irish House of Lords. He became the Member of Parliament (MP) for Callan in 1727. He had a townhouse at Cuffe Street in Dublin and a country house at Farmley in Kilkenny.

His nephew, also Warden Flood, was MP for Longford Borough, Baltinglass, Carysfort, and Taghmon.

He had several children by Isabella Whiteside, but whether the couple were legally married is doubtful. His most famous child, the statesman Henry Flood, who is thought to have been Isabella's son, was generally believed to have been born out of wedlock.

References

|-

|-

1694 births
1764 deaths
Irish MPs 1727–1760
Members of the Parliament of Ireland (pre-1801) for County Kilkenny constituencies
Solicitors-General for Ireland
Attorneys-General for Ireland
Members of the Privy Council of Ireland
People from County Kilkenny
People educated at Kilkenny College
Members of the Middle Temple
Alumni of Trinity College Dublin
Lords chief justice of Ireland